This a list of the starting quarterbacks for the Texas Longhorns football teams since 1944.
They are listed in order of the first game each player started for the Longhorns that season.
A player is credited with a win if he started the game and the team won that game, no matter if the player was injured or permanently removed after the first play.

Starting Quarterbacks by Year

Career Record

See also
Texas Longhorns football statistical leaders

References

Texas Longhorns football seasons
Texas Longhorns football seasons
Lists of college football quarterbacks